Four Mile Cliff is a rock cliff,  long, that flanks the southern side of Debenham Glacier north of Mount Bevilacqua. A descriptive name was applied by the Advisory Committee on Antarctic Names in 2007.

References

Cliffs of Victoria Land